Rachel Heck (born ) is an American amateur golfer.

Early life and amateur career
Heck, a native of Memphis, Tennessee started playing golf with her two sisters almost as soon as she could walk, competing in friendly competitions for ice cream. Her older sister, Abby, played collegiate golf at University of Notre Dame and younger sister, Anna, who is committed to play golf at the University of Notre Dame, competed in the 2021 U.S. Women's Amateur Four-Ball.

A golf prodigy, Heck was a five-time AJGA All-American. She was the youngest competitor in the 2017 U.S. Women's Open, tied for 33rd. She also made the cut at the 2018 Evian Championship, tied for 44th. She was a member of the 2018 U.S. Junior Ryder Cup team, sinking the putt that clinched the title for the U.S. She was named USA Today's High School Golfer of the Year in 2017 and 2018.

Heck was a member of the 2019 U.S. Junior Solheim Cup team, going 2–1 over three rounds of match play. She also competed in the U.S. Women's Amateur and finished T8 in the Girl's Junior PGA Championship. She also earned one of four amateur spots at the 2019 ANA Inspiration. Along with later fellow Stanford Cardinal Sadie Englemann, she advanced to the semifinals of the 2019 U.S. Women's Amateur Four-Ball.

In 2020, Heck was the stroke-play medalist in the U.S. Women's Amateur, shooting 4-under-par across two rounds. She advanced to the round of 16 before falling, 1 up, to eventual champion Rose Zhang. She was also a quarterfinalist in the 2020 North and South Women's Amateur.

Heck enrolled at Stanford University in 2021 to play golf with the Stanford Cardinal women's golf team. In her freshman year, she recorded six individual collegiate wins. She became the third player in college history to sweep conference (Pac-12), regional (Stanford Regional) and national titles (NCAAs), joining USC's Annie Park and Arizona's Marisa Baena. Heck became the first Stanford woman to win an NCAA title, and the ninth freshman to achieve the feat. Her 69.72 scoring average over 25 rounds is the lowest in NCAA women's golf history. 

Heck claimed medalist honors in the qualifier for the 2021 U.S. Women's Open in Novato, California, with a 36-hole total of 8-under 136. She finished 3rd at the Augusta National Women's Amateur and won The Spirit International Amateur Golf Championship with Team USA. Heck was the 2021 Honda Sports Award recipient and the Annika Award recipient for being the top collegiate golfer.

Amateur wins
2016 Bubba Conlee Tournament
2017 Rolex Girls Junior Championship
2018 Polo Golf Junior Classic, Kathy Whitworth Invitational
2021 The Gunrock Invitational, Fresno State Classic, Pac-12 Women's Championship, NCAA Stanford Regional, NCAA Championship
2022 Lamkin San Diego Invitational, The Gunrock Invitational 

Source:

Results in LPGA majors
Results not in chronological order before 2019 or in 2020.

CUT = missed the half-way cut
NT = no tournament
T = tied

U.S. national team appearances
Amateur
Junior Ryder Cup: 2018 (winners)
Junior Solheim Cup: 2017 (winners), 2019 (winners)
Curtis Cup: 2021 (winners), 2022 (winners)
The Spirit International Amateur Golf Championship: 2021 (winners)
Arnold Palmer Cup: 2022
Espirito Santo Trophy: 2022

Source:

References

External links

American female golfers
Stanford Cardinal women's golfers
Golfers from Memphis, Tennessee
2002 births
Living people